The list of ship launches in 1669 includes a chronological list of some ships launched in 1669.


References

1669
Ship launches